In mathematics, orbit capacity of a subset of a topological dynamical system may be thought of heuristically as a “topological dynamical probability measure” of the subset. More precisely, its value for a set is a tight upper bound for the normalized number of visits of orbits in this set.

Definition 

A topological dynamical system consists of a compact Hausdorff topological space X and a homeomorphism . Let  be a set. Lindenstrauss introduced the definition of orbit capacity:

Here,  is the membership function for the set . That is  if  and is zero otherwise.

Properties 
Obviously, one has . By convention, topological dynamical systems do not come equipped with a measure; the orbit capacity can be thought of as defining one, in a "natural" way. It is not a true measure, it is only sub-additive:

 Orbit capacity is sub-additive:

 

 For a closed set C,

 

 where MT(X) is the collection of T-invariant probability measures on X.

Small sets 
When ,  is called small. These sets occur in the definition of the small boundary property.

References 

Topological dynamics